The first decade of the 16th century marked the creation of some significant compositions.  These were to become some of the most famous compositions of the century.

Events 
1500: We Wish You a Merry Christmas was written
1501: 
April 28 – Bartolomeo Tromboncino receives an unhelpful letter of reference from Francesco II Gonzaga, Marquess of Mantua, after abandoning his position at the Mantua court without permission for the second time.
May – Francisco de Peñalosa receives an increase in salary to 30,000 maravedis, the maximum paid to a singer-chaplain in the royal chapel of Ferdinand II of Aragon.
June 1 – Antoine Brumel is hired as a singer at the court of Philibert II, Duke of Savoy at Chambéry.
September – Jean Mouton begins a short tenure at the collegiate church of St André in Grenoble, teaching plainchant and polyphony to choirboys.
October 16 – Nikolaus Decius matriculates at Leipzig University.
exact date unknown – Robert Fayrfax graduates with a MusB at Cambridge University.
1502: 
June 1 – Antoine de Longueval joins the chapel of Philibert II, Duke of Savoy, at a salary half again higher than any other singer.
exact date unknown – Adam of Fulda matriculates at the newly founded University of Wittenberg
1503: Pierre de la Rue, Alexander Agricola and Henry Bredemers travel to Heidelberg with the Habsburg court, where they most probably meet Arnolt Schlick.
April 1503: Josquin des Prez leaves France and is employed by Ercole d'Este I in Ferrara; he leaves for Condé-sur-l'Escaut in April 1504.
1504:
May 3 – Josquin des Prez arrives in Condé-sur-l'Escaut to assume the post of Provost of the collegiate church of Notre Dame, recently vacated by Pierre Duwez.
Jacob Obrecht succeeds Josquin des Prez as maestro di capella in Ferrara.
June 1505: After the death of Ercole d'Este and the succession of Alfonso I as Duke of Ferrara, Obrecht finds himself unemployed, but before he can secure another post, contracts the plague and dies scarcely a month after his employer.
1506:
June 5 – Heinrich Glarean begins his studies at the University of Cologne.
June 19 – On the recommendation of Emperor Maximilian I, Hans Buchner is appointed organist of the cathedral of Konstanz.
exact date unknown – Antoine Brumel settles in Ferrara, replacing Jacob Obrecht (who died in July 1505) at Alfonso I's court.
1507: Paul Hofhaimer settles in Augsburg, where he could be closer to Roman emperor Maximilian I whom he served as organist

Publications 

 1501: Harmonice musices odhecaton A, the first printed collection of polyphonic music, published by Ottaviano Petrucci in Venice. It was followed by two more volumes, in 1502 and 1503.
 1502: Josquin des Prez – , published by Ottaviano Petrucci, including the Missa L'homme armé super voces musicales
 1503: 
Antoine Brumel – 4 Masses for four voices (Venice: Ottaviano Petricci)
Johannes Ghiselin –  for four voices (Venice: Ottaviano Petrucci)
Jacob Obrecht –  for four voices (Venice: Ottaviano Petrucci)
Pierre de la Rue –  for four voices (Venice: Ottaviano Petrucci)
 1504: Alexander Agricola –  (Venice: Ottaviano Petrucci)
 1507: Francesco Spinacino –  (two volumes), the earliest known publication of lute music
 1508: Joan Ambrosio Dalza – , published by Ottaviano Petrucci, including the earliest known publication of music for the pavane

Compositions 
 1501: Loyset Compère – Gaude prole regia/Sancta Catharina, ceremonial motet for five voices, written for the reception of Duke Philip the Fair, in his capacity of Governor of the Netherlands, in Paris on November 25.
 1502: Josquin des Prez – Salve regina, for five voices.
 1503–04: Josquin des Prez
Miserere mei Deus (Psalm 50/51), for five voices
Virgo salutiferi (motet)
 1504: August – Bartolomeo Tromboncino, "Sì è debile il filo", frottola, and the earliest known setting of a Petrarchan canzone; later published in Petrucci's seventh book of frottolas (Venice, 1507).
 1507: Heinrich Isaac – Virgo prudentissima, motet for six voices

Births 
 1500: 
November 3, Benvenuto Cellini, cornettist and recorder player, best known as a goldsmith and sculptor (died February 13, 1571)
probable 
Arnold von Bruck, Franco-Flemish composer (died 1554)
Cristóbal de Morales, Spanish composer (died 1553)
 1502: July 27 – Francesco Corteccia, Italian composer (died 1571)
 c. 1505
 Thomas Tallis, English composer (died 1585)
 Christopher Tye, English composer and organist (died c. 1572)
 c. 1507: Jacques Arcadelt, Franco-Flemish composer (died 1568)

Deaths 

 1500: estimated – John Browne, English composer of music from the Eton Choirbook (born c. 1453)
 1501: February 17 – Stephan Plannck, German music printer active in Italy (born c. 1457)
 1505
 date unknown – Adam of Fulda, German composer and theoretician (born c. 1445), plague
 July – Jacob Obrecht, Flemish composer (born 1457 or 1458), plague
 1506: 
May 2 – Johannes von Soest, German composer (born 1448)
August 15 – Alexander Agricola, Flemish composer (born c. 1445), plague
 1507: late February – Francisco de la Torre, Spanish composer, possibly plague

References 

16th century in music
Music